= There, There (restaurant) =

Restaurant in Providence, Rhode Island, U.S.

- Interactive map of There, There

Restaurant information
- Location: 471 West Fountain Street, Providence, Rhode Island, 02903, United States
- Coordinates: 41°49′07″N 71°25′33″W

There, There is a restaurant in Providence, Rhode Island. It has been described as a "modern" diner with comfort food and a "comfortable vibe". The business was named one of twelve best new restaurants in the U.S. by Eater in 2023.
